Agil Etemadi (born 23 April 1987) is a professional footballer who plays as a goalkeeper for Almere City. Born in Iran, he has represented the Netherlands at youth level.

Club career 
After starting as a youth player for vv GAVC from Grou, Etemadi moved to SC Heerenveen and came through their youth system. He later played for Eerste Divisie teams Emmen, Veendam and Almere City. He also was a back-up goalkeeper at Groningen and played in Iran for Tractor Sazi.

He went on a trial with Iran Pro League club Steel Azin in 2009 but he was not signed. In summer 2017, Etemadi signed a two-year contract with another Eerste Divisie side, De Graafschap.

International career 
Etemadi has been invited to Netherlands national under-21 football team before. He has stated that he wishes to play for Iran national football team.

Personal life 
Etemadi was born in Tehran, Iran and moved to Holland, aged 6. He can speak Persian. He is the brother of former-Iranian football player Zabih Etemadi.

References

External links
 PersianLeague Profile
 Voetbal International Profile 
 

1987 births
Living people
Sportspeople from Tehran
Iranian emigrants to the Netherlands
People with acquired Dutch citizenship
Association football goalkeepers
Dutch footballers
Iranian footballers
Iranian expatriate footballers
SC Heerenveen players
FC Emmen players
SC Veendam players
FC Groningen players
Tractor S.C. players
Almere City FC players
De Graafschap players
Eredivisie players
Eerste Divisie players